Melissa Altro (born May 16, 1982) is a Canadian voice actress and voiceover coach from Montreal, Quebec.

Biography 
Prior to having a career to voice acting, Altro guest-starred on a 1994 episode of the YTV/Nickelodeon horror anthology series Are You Afraid of the Dark?. She also starred as Heather in the 1995 film Kids of the Round Table and as Barb in The Woods. Altro is perhaps best known as the voice actor of Muffy Crosswire in the hit television series Arthur and she has been voicing her ever since she was a little kid at 12 years of age, which makes her the only child voice actress of the show to continue voicing her character while being an adult. She has also voiced her Arthur character in the series Postcards from Buster, and the specials Arthur's Perfect Christmas and Arthur's Halloween. She also has voiced other characters in Arthur, Altro also provides the voice for Gretchen in the Teletoon/Disney XD animated series Camp Lakebottom. She has also provides the voice for Pippi Longstocking in the 1997 film and the series of the same name.

Altro is an alumna of St. George's School of Montreal and McGill University, where she majored in English, Drama and Theatre, both located in her hometown.

In 2019, Altro became the announcer of Subway across Canada.

Filmography

Film

Television

Video Games

References

External links

Voice Pro Studio with Melissa Altro on Facebook
Melissa Altro's Tips for Voicing Cartoons on YouTube

1982 births
Actresses from Montreal
Canadian television actresses
Canadian voice actresses
Living people
Canadian child actresses
McGill University alumni
Anglophone Quebec people
Canadian people of Italian descent
20th-century Canadian actresses
21st-century Canadian actresses
Arthur (TV series)